James William McBain FRS (March 22, 1882 – March 12, 1953) was a Canadian chemist.

He gained a Master of Arts at Toronto University and a Doctor of Science at Heidelberg University.

He carried out pioneering work in the area of micelles at the University of Bristol. As early as 1913 he postulated the existence of "colloidal ions", now known as micelles, to explain the good electrolytic conductivity of sodium palmitate solutions. He was elected a Fellow of the Royal Society in May 1923  He won their Davy Medal in 1939.

References

Fellows of the Royal Society
1882 births
1953 deaths
Canadian physical chemists